The Old Tappan Public Schools is a comprehensive community public school district serving students in kindergarten through eighth grade from Old Tappan in Bergen County, New Jersey, United States.

As of the 2018–19 school year, the district, comprising two schools, had an enrollment of 655 students and 61.2 classroom teachers (on an FTE basis), for a student–teacher ratio of 10.7:1.

The district is classified by the New Jersey Department of Education as being in District Factor Group "I", the second-highest of eight groupings. District Factor Groups organize districts statewide to allow comparison by common socioeconomic characteristics of the local districts. From lowest socioeconomic status to highest, the categories are A, B, CD, DE, FG, GH, I and J.

Students in public school for ninth through twelfth grades attend Northern Valley Regional High School at Old Tappan, together with students from Harrington Park, Northvale and Norwood, along with students from Rockleigh who attend the high school as part of a sending/receiving relationship. As of the 2018–19 school year, the high school had an enrollment of 1,170 students and 97.9 classroom teachers (on an FTE basis), for a student–teacher ratio of 12.0:1. The school is one of the two schools of the Northern Valley Regional High School District, which also serves students from the neighboring communities of Closter, Demarest and Haworth at the Northern Valley Regional High School at Demarest. During the 1994-96 school years, Northern Valley Regional High School at Old Tappan was awarded the Blue Ribbon School Award of Excellence by the United States Department of Education.

The district participates in special education programs offered by Region III, one of seven such regional programs in Bergen County. Region III coordinates and develops special education programs for the 1,000 students with learning disabilities in the region, which also includes the Alpine, Closter, Demarest, Harrington Park, Haworth, Northvale, Norwood and Old Tappan districts, as well as the Northern Valley Regional High School District.

Schools
Schools in the district (with 2018–19 enrollment data from the National Center for Education Statistics) are:
T. Baldwin Demarest Elementary School with 346 students in grades K - 4
Kathleen Boyce, Principal
Charles DeWolf Middle School with 294 students in grades 5 - 8
Jennifer Santa, Principal

Administration
Core members of the district's administration are:
Danielle M. Da Giau, Superintendent
Douglas Barrett, Business Administrator / Board Secretary

Board of education
The district's board of education, with five members, sets policy and oversees the fiscal and educational operation of the district through its administration. As a Type II school district, the board's trustees are elected directly by voters to serve three-year terms of office on a staggered basis, with one or two seats up for election each year held (since 2012) as part of the November general election. The board appoints a superintendent to oversee the day-to-day operation of the district.

References

External links
Old Tappan Public Schools

Data for Old Tappan Public Schools, National Center for Education Statistics
Northern Valley Regional High School at Old Tappan

Old Tappan, New Jersey
New Jersey District Factor Group I
School districts in Bergen County, New Jersey